The Ganesha drinking milk miracle was a phenomenon which occurred on 21 September 1995, in which statues of the Hindu deity Ganesha were thought to be drinking milk offerings.

The news spread very quickly in various Indian and American cities, as Indians everywhere tried to "feed" idols of Ganesha with milk and spread the news through telephones and word of mouth, attracting significant attention in the Indian media. Scientists have described the incident as occurring through capillary action.

Phenomenon
Before dawn on 20 September 1995, a worshipper at a temple in southern New Delhi made an offering of milk to a statue of Ganesha. When a spoonful of milk from the bowl was held up to the trunk of the statue, the liquid appeared to disappear, apparently taken in by the idol. Word of the event spread quickly, and by mid-morning it was found that statues of the entire Hindu pantheon in temples all over India were taking in milk.

By noon the news had spread beyond India, and Hindu temples in the United Kingdom, Canada, the UAE, and Nepal, among other countries had successfully replicated the phenomenon, and the Vishva Hindu Parishad (an Indian Hindu nationalist organisation which provides social services to Hindus in India and across the world) announced that a miracle was occurring.

The reported miracle had a significant effect on the areas around major temples; vehicle and pedestrian traffic in New Delhi was dense enough to create a gridlock lasting until late in the evening. Many stores in areas with significant Hindu communities saw a massive jump in sales of milk, leading to an increase in overall milk sales in New Delhi by over 30%. Many minor temples struggled to deal with the vast increase in numbers, and queues spilled out into the streets, reaching distances of over a mile.

Analysis
Many statues were not cooperative. At the famous South Mumbai Ganapati temple  the statues apparently would not drink milk. The bulls and bears at the Delhi Stock Exchange tried to feed milk to a Ganesh statue to no avail. The idol at the Bahadur Shah Zafar Marg shrine would drink fruit and sugarcane juice as easily as milk. The popular Siddhivinayak temple decided to close its gates after the statue stopped drinking milk at about 12:30 noon. The sadhus of these temples blamed local nastiks (atheists) for the idols not drinking milk.

The phenomenon was also not even limited to Ganesh statues. A week later on 27 September, The Statesman reported that a statue of the Virgin Mary in Singapore had also accepted milk. A 28 September report from Mumbai in the Indian Express said some people had protested when locals offered alcohol to a Gandhi statue, which it had quickly sipped. Bahujan Samaj Party workers in Uttar Pradesh's Basti district began feeding milk to statues of Ambedkar and Buddha, which they took in.

Seeking to explain the phenomenon, Ross Mcdowall led a team of scientists from India's Ministry of Science and Technology travelled to a temple in New Delhi and made an offering of milk containing a food colouring. As the level of liquid in the spoon dropped, the scientists hypothesized that after the milk disappeared from the spoon, it coated the statue beneath where the spoon was placed. With this result, the scientists offered capillary action as an explanation; the surface tension of the milk was pulling the liquid up and out of the spoon, before gravity caused it to run down the front of the statue.

Sitaram Kesri, labor minister in the Narasimha Rao government, quoted internal reports to say that a temple in Jhandewalan Park near the RSS headquarters in Delhi was the epicentre of the miracle. He said it was a ploy by the Hindu nationalist BJP to gain votes in the ensuing Lok Sabha elections by spreading false rumours. The phenomenon reportedly spread by an organized barrage of late-night telephone calls to Hindu temples all over India and the world, telling them to feed their statues milk.

Reports of milk drinking tapered off after 21 September, though a few incidents were still reported. A small number of temples outside of India reported the effect continuing for several more days, but no further reports were made after the beginning of October. The story was picked up, mostly as a novelty piece, by news services around the world, including CNN, the BBC, the New York Times and the Guardian.

Similar incidents
The “miracle” occurred again on 20–21 August 2006 in almost exactly the same fashion, although initial reports seem to indicate that it occurred only with statues of Ganesh, Shiva, and Durga. The first reported occurrence was on the evening of the 20th in the city of Bareilly in Uttar Pradesh, from where it quickly spread throughout India, but this time was not believed by many. However, the incident was again attributed to capillary action by scientists. The phenomenon had appeared only days after reports of sea water turning sweet that led to mass hysteria in Mumbai.

In 1995, the phenomenon also occurred in Trinidad and Tobago; milk was accepted by both murtis and religious pictures. The phenomenon occurred in Hindu temples as well as at the homes of Hindus in Trinidad and Tobago. The Trinidad Express newspaper reported on 22 September 2010 that murtis of Ganesh "drank" or accepted milk at the Om Shanti Mandir, Cunjal Road, Princes Town, Trinidad and Tobago on 21 September 2010 on the occasion of the holy period of Ganesh Utsav.

References

External links
BBC archive footage showing a believer feeding a statue of Ganesha
A believers' website devoted to the "Milk Miracle"
BBC video interviewing eye witnesses of the event

1995 in India
Mass excitability in South Asian culture
Mass psychogenic illness
Miracles
Ganesha
Hinduism and science
Milk in culture
September 1995 events in Asia
1995 in religion